Meehae Ryo (born September 1, 1967) is a Korean cellist, who performs as an international soloist, especially around Europe. At the age of six, Ryo started her music education and was considered a skillful student. After moving to USA, Ryo entered Juilliard School at the age of 16 and finished her studies with DMA degree at the University of Michigan. Regarded as a late bloomer, in 2014 Ryo published an album produced by Deutsche Grammophon and has been more active within Europe ever since.

Early life and education 
Meehae Ryo was born in Seoul, Korea on September 1, 1967. Her mother, Okja Lee, had a great passion for classical music, thus, provided instruments and education to her three children (cello, violin and clarinet). At a young age, Ryo showed promising talent in both piano and cello, winning several national competitions. As her ambition grew, Ryo asked her parent to search for a school abroad that would expand her musical horizon.

With her parents' support, Ryo entered Juilliard Pre-College and graduated in both Juilliard School of Music and the University of Michigan. From then on, Ryo continued her studies within University of Michigan until she completed her studies with a DMA and a PhD degree in music.

Career 
After finishing her studies, Ryo returned to Korea in 1997. There, she started to perform on stage, especially in Seoul Art Centre. However, Ryo focused more on teaching her pupils, especially for university entry exam. It is only from 2002 where she expanded her performance activity, thus giving several performances in both Europe, Korea and United States. Ryo performed in many well-known concert halls, including: Musikverein Golden Hall, Verdi Hall, Hercules Hall, Smetana Hall, Dvorak Hall, Liszt Hall, Carnegie Hall, Auditorium della conciliazione and Berliner Philharmonic Hall.

In 2013, Ryo and Albena Danailova were invited at Cesky Krumlov Music Festival and played Brahms Double concerto, which aired on the Czech National Broadcast. Soon after, Budapest Symphony Orchestra invited Ryo once again in Abonoment program of Budapest Symphony Orchestra with Andras Buschatz, performing Double concerto for violin and cello in Listz Hall, Budapest.

As her activities started to become more frequent in several different countries, Ryo was offered an opportunity to record her first album with Prague Radio Symphony Orchestra with Vladimir Valek as their conductor, in commemoration of Schumann's 150th death. In 2013, Deutsche Grammophon published an album, where Ryo recorded Saint-Saëns and Elgar cello concerto with Nuremberg Symphony Orchestra.

References 

South Korean classical cellists
South Korean women classical cellists
Musicians from Seoul
1967 births
Living people
Juilliard School alumni
University of Michigan School of Music, Theatre & Dance alumni